Renegades of the West is a 1932 American Western film directed by Casey Robinson and written by Albert S. Le Vino. The film stars Tom Keene, Roscoe Ates, Betty Furness, James Mason and Carl Miller. The film was released on November 25, 1932, by RKO Pictures.

Plot
After learning of his father's killer in prison, Tom Bagby goes undercover to prove Curly Bogard, whom he believes did it, is guilty. Tom gets a job on Curly's ranch and tries to get evidence against him, but his plans are foiled when the plot twists and his cellmate comes and exposes his identity.

Cast 
Tom Keene as Tom Bagby
Roscoe Ates as Dr. Henry Fawcett
Betty Furness as Mary Fawcett
James Mason as Blackie
Carl Miller as Banker Rankin
Max Wagner as Bob
Rockliffe Fellowes as Curly Bogard
Roland Southern as Abandoned Baby
Jules Cowles as Marshal
Joseph W. Girard as James Dowling (as Joe Girard)
Jack Pennick as Dave

References

External links 
 

1932 films
American black-and-white films
RKO Pictures films
American Western (genre) films
1932 Western (genre) films
Films produced by B. F. Zeidman
Films directed by Casey Robinson
1930s English-language films
1930s American films